RJH may refer to:
 Shah Makhdum Airport, Bangladesh, by IATA code
 Jules Horowitz Reactor, material test reactor in France